Garth Counsell was bishop of Table Bay, a suffragan bishop of the Anglican Diocese of Cape Town, from 2004 to 2020. He was succeeded by Joshua Louw. Like the Bishop of Dover he was in effect the Diocesan Bishop as his superior is Primate of an Ecclesiastical Province.

Notes

21st-century Anglican Church of Southern Africa bishops
Anglican suffragan bishops in South Africa
Year of birth missing (living people)
Living people
Anglican bishops of Cape Town